Friedersdorf may refer to:


People
Conor Friedersdorf, American journalist

Places

Germany
Friedersdorf, Saxony, a municipality in the district Löbau-Zittau, Saxony
Friedersdorf, Saxony-Anhalt, a municipality in the district Anhalt-Bitterfeld, Saxony-Anhalt
Friedersdorf, Thuringia, a municipality in the district Ilm-Kreis, Thuringia
Friedersdorf, Dahme-Spreewald, a municipality in the district Dahme-Spreewald, Brandenburg

Poland
Biedrzychowice, Opole Voivodeship, a village in south-western Poland, German name Friedersdorf

See also
Fredersdorf (disambiguation)